Longkam is a village in Mu Se Township, Mu Se District, northern Shan State, Myanmar (Burma).

Geography
Longkam lies in a valley, 1 km southwest of Nawngwao. The elevation is 1,057 m.

Further reading
 Map - Districts of Shan (North) State

References

Populated places in Shan State
China–Myanmar border